Samuel I. Schwartz, also known as Gridlock Sam, is an American transportation engineer, formerly the New York City Traffic Commissioner, notable for popularizing the phrase "gridlock".

Life and career
Schartz was educated at Brooklyn College (BS Physics) and the University of Pennsylvania (MSCE), and first worked as a New York City cabbie before being hired by the City of New York in 1971. He served as NYC Traffic Commissioner from 1982 to 1986, and when the traffic department became subsumed by the Department of Transportation he held the second-in-command post of First Deputy Commissioner and Chief Engineer from 1986-1990. While employed with the city, he attempted to introduce bicycle lanes and public plazas. They were vetoed at the last minute by then-mayor John Lindsay. He earned the nickname Gridlock Sam during the 1980 transit strike when he developed a series of transportation contingency plans, called the Grid-Lock Prevention Program.

It was under Schwartz's watch that the city almost became the first city to implement congestion pricing. The city's bridges had not been tolled since 1911 and beginning in 1973 he worked with Mayor Lindsay to reintroduce them. Even with a change in leadership (Mayor Lindsay was replaced by Abe Beame in 1974) it looked like the tolls would be reinstated. However, an act of Congress nixed the proposal in 1977. See: Congestion pricing in New York City.

After he left city government around 1996, he started his own firm. He writes columns for New York City's Daily News, lower Manhattan’s Downtown Express, The Queens Chronicle and in the Yiddish News Report as Gridlock Shmuel. He also tweets, and blogs for the Public Broadcasting Service and Engineering News-Record.

References

External links 

Year of birth missing (living people)
Living people
Brooklyn College alumni
University of Pennsylvania School of Engineering and Applied Science alumni
Transport engineers
American civil engineers
American columnists
American taxi drivers